Matthew Arthur, 1st Baron Glenarthur,  (9 March 1852 – 23 September 1928), known as Sir Matthew Arthur, 1st Baronet, from 1903 to 1918, was a Scottish businessman.

Background
Glenarthur was son of James Arthur of Carlung in Ayrshire and of Barshaw in Renfrewshire, the founder of the wholesale clothing business of Arthur & Co. His mother was the suffragist and philanthropist Jane Glen Arthur, daughter of Thomas Glen of Thornhill in Renfrewshire.

Career
Glenarthur was Chairman of the family firm of Arthur and Co, and also of the Lochgelly Iron and Coal Company and of the Glasgow and South Western Railway Company. Apart from his business career he was also a member of the Royal Company of Archers.

Honours
Arthur was created a Baronet, of Carlung, in the parish of West Kilbride, in the County of Ayr, on 28 November 1902, and on 5 July 1918 he was raised to the peerage as Baron Glenarthur, of Carlung, in the County of Ayr. The title of the barony derived from the joining of his mother's maiden name and his patronymic.

Family
Lord Glenarthur married Janet McGrigor, daughter of Alexander Bennett McGrigor, in 1876. He died in September 1928, aged 76, and was succeeded in his titles by his son Cecil. Lady Glenarthur died in 1946.

References

Kidd, Charles, Williamson, David (editors). Debrett's Peerage and Baronetage (1990 edition). New York: St Martin's Press, 1990.

1852 births
1928 deaths
Deputy Lieutenants of Ayrshire
Directors of the Glasgow and South Western Railway
Members of the Royal Company of Archers
Scottish justices of the peace
Barons created by George V
Place of birth missing
Matthew 1